Maria Sanchez and Taylor Townsend were the defending champions, but both players chose to participate with different partners. Townsend partnered Asia Muhammad, but lost in the first round. Sanchez partnered Jessica Pegula and reached the final, losing to Julia Glushko and Alexandra Panova in the final, 7–5, 6–4.

Seeds

Draw

References 
 Draw

Revolution Technologies Pro Tennis Classic - Doubles